James Howard Yellin (born 1938) is an American diplomat who served as the United States ambassador to Burundi between September 26, 2002, and July 21, 2005.

References

Living people
1938 births
Ambassadors of the United States to Burundi
21st-century American diplomats